Andrés Alejandro Díaz (born March 21, 1983) is an Argentine football midfielder.

Career 
Díaz made his debut for Rosario Central in 2003. In July 2007 he signed with Benfica in a 6 million euro transfer that also involved his teammate Ángel Di María. Benfica would receive 50% future transfer fees of the player and other parties receive another 50%.

In 2008, he returned to Argentina, joining Banfield on an 18 months loan deal for the Clausura 2008 tournament On February 20, 2009 Barcelona Guayaquil  have signed the Argentine midfielder on loan from Portuguese club S.L. Benfica. Diaz was previously on loan at Argentine club Banfield.

In February 2011 he moved to Deportes Concepción of Chile

References

External links
 Argentine Primera statistics  

1983 births
Living people
Footballers from Rosario, Santa Fe
Argentine footballers
Rosario Central footballers
S.L. Benfica footballers
Club Atlético Banfield footballers
Barcelona S.C. footballers
Deportes Concepción (Chile) footballers
Argentine Primera División players
Primeira Liga players
Argentine expatriate footballers
Expatriate footballers in Chile
Expatriate footballers in Ecuador
Expatriate footballers in Portugal
Association football midfielders